Draycott Hotel is a 5-star hotel in London, England.

Location
The Draycott Hotel is located in a 19th-century townhouse at 26 Cadogan Gardens in Knightsbridge, within the borough of Kensington & Chelsea. It is situated near Sloane Square.

Notable guests
Previous guests have included the Queen of Denmark, Gary Oldman and Pierce Brosnan.

References

External links
Official website

Chelsea, London
Hotels in London